Kang the Conqueror (Nathaniel Richards) is a supervillain appearing in American comic books published by Marvel Comics. The character is most frequently depicted as an opponent of the Avengers and the Fantastic Four. A time-traveling entity and descendant of the scientist of the same name, several alternate versions of Kang have appeared throughout Marvel Comics titles over the years, including his respective future and past heroic selves, Pharaoh Rama-Tut, Immortus, the Scarlet Centurion, Victorex Prime, Victor Timely, Iron Lad, Chronomonitor #616, and Qeng Gryphon. Other characters to assume the title of "Kang" include Kang's sons Marcus and Ahura Boltagon, his wives Ravonna, Mantis, and Nebula, as well as alternate versions of Sue Storm and Kamala Khan.

Kang the Conqueror has been described as one of Marvel's most notable and powerful villains. Kang has made media appearances in animated television and video games. He made his feature film debut in the Marvel Cinematic Universe (MCU) film Ant-Man and the Wasp: Quantumania (2023), portrayed by Jonathan Majors, who also portrayed Pharaoh Rama-Tut, Victor Timely, Immortus, Scarlet Centurion, Chronomonitor #616, and the wider Council of Kangs in the film's mid-credits scene, and will reprise the roles in Avengers: The Kang Dynasty (2025) and Avengers: Secret Wars (2026). Majors also previously appeared as "He Who Remains", a version of the character from the previous incarnation of multiverse and creator of the Time Variance Authority (TVA), in the episode "For All Time. Always." from the 2021 first season of Loki, and will return as Victor Timely in the series' 2023 second season.

Publication history
The character who would become best known as Kang first appeared in Fantastic Four #19 (October 1963), by Stan Lee and Jack Kirby. This issue introduced the pharaoh Rama-Tut, a criminal from the year 3000 who had travelled back in time and conquered ancient Egypt, and who was implied to be a descendant (or possibly future incarnation) of Fantastic Four villain Doctor Doom. After a second appearance the following year in Fantastic Four Annual #2 (September 1964), the character appeared again in The Avengers #8 (published the same month), also by Lee and Kirby, which revealed that Rama-Tut had gone on to travel to the year 4000, where he had adopted the identity of Kang. A decade later, the character of Immortus, previously introduced in Avengers #10 (November 1964), was retroactively established to be a future identity of Kang's in Giant-Size Avengers #3 (February 1975). After further being retroactively established to be a direct descendant of Reed Richards' father Nathaniel (via one of Reed's many half-siblings) in Fantastic Four #272 (November 1984), Kang's birth name was revealed to also be "Nathaniel Richards" in What If…? Vol. 2 #39 (July 1992), a fact later incorporated into the primary continuity of the Marvel Universe.

Fictional character biography

Pre-Kang
Nathaniel Richards, a 31st-century scholar and descendant of Reed Richards' time traveling father Nathaniel, becomes fascinated with history and discovers the time travel technology created by Victor von Doom, another possible ancestor of his. He then travels back in time to ancient Egypt aboard a Sphinx-shaped timeship and becomes the Pharaoh Rama-Tut (while a variant of him is simultaneously recruited by the Time Variance Authority (TVA) as Chronomonitor #616), with plans to claim En Sabah Nur—the mutant destined to become Apocalypse—as his heir. The pharaoh's rule is cut short when he is defeated by the time-displaced Fantastic Four. An embittered Nathaniel Richards travels forward to the 20th century where he meets Doctor Doom, whom he believes might be his ancestor. He later designs an armor based on Doom's and, calling himself the Scarlet Centurion, pits the Avengers team against alternate-reality counterparts. He plans to dispose of all of them, but the Avengers manage to force him from the timeline, where a divergent version of him becomes Victorex Prime, archenemy of the Squadron Supreme.

Nathaniel then tries to return to the 31st century, but overshoots by a thousand years, discovering a war-torn Earth that uses advanced weapons they no longer understand. He finds it simple to conquer the planet, expanding his dominion throughout the galaxy, and reinvents himself as Kang the Conqueror. But this future world is dying, and so he decides to take over an earlier, more fertile Earth.

Early appearances and Ravonna
On Nathaniel's first foray into the 20th century under the Kang identity, he meets and battles the Avengers, capturing everyone but the Wasp and Rick Jones, and informs the world that they have 24 hours to surrender to him. Jones and some friends pretend they want to help Kang, but double-cross him once they gain access to his ship, and the Avengers are freed. In an attempt to stop them, Kang releases radiation that only beings from his time are immune to, but Thor uses his hammer to absorb the rays and send them back at the warlord so even he cannot withstand it, and he is forced to escape. He later attempts to defeat the Avengers using a Spider-Man robot, but the real Spider-Man destroys it.

In his own time, Kang falls for the princess of one of his subject kingdoms, Ravonna, who does not return his feelings. In an attempt to demonstrate his power, he kidnaps the Avengers and, after several escape attempts on their part, subdues them and the rebellious kingdom with the help of his army. When Kang refuses to execute Ravonna, his commanders revolt and he frees the Avengers to fight with him against them. They successfully subdue them, but not before Ravonna is mortally wounded when she leaps in front of a blast meant for Kang, realizing she does love him after all. Kang returns the Avengers to their present, and places Ravonna's body in stasis.

Kang appears in modern-day as he attempts to retrieve a rogue Growing Man construct who is growing larger with every blow. Both Thor and the police are not able to subdue the giant, until Kang appears from a time machine disguised as a boulder. He fires a ray, shrinking and subduing the Growing Man to doll-sized so he can be "re-hidden". He later reactivates the Growing Man to kidnap an incapacitated Tony Stark and draw the Avengers into his game, though the purpose isn't revealed. Thor fails to keep Kang from escaping into the time-stream.

In hopes of restoring his love to life, Kang enters a wager with the cosmic entity Grandmaster, using the Avengers as pawns in a game which, if won, can temporarily grant him power over life and death. The first round ends in stalemate when an unaware Black Knight intervenes and prevents a clear victory by the Avengers, although the team definitively wins the second round. Due to the first round's stalemate, Kang does not earn the power of both life and death but is forced to choose. He selects the power of death over the Avengers, but is stopped by the Black Knight, who, not being an Avenger at the time, is unaffected.

Next Kang kidnaps the Hulk and sends him to 1917 France to kill the Phantom Eagle before he can destroy a giant German cannon which would otherwise kill Banner's grandfather who is fighting in the trenches. This would prevent the Hulk from existing and consequently, the formation of the Avengers. However, the Hulk destroys the cannon which sends him back to the present while Kang is projected into the Limbo.

The Celestial Madonna
Some time later Kang reappears at Avengers Mansion seeking the "Celestial Madonna", who turns out to be Mantis, desiring to marry her as she is apparently destined to have a powerful child. The heroes are aided by a future version of Kang, who, tired of conquest, had returned to ancient Egypt and his identity of Rama-Tut, ruling benevolently for ten years before placing himself in suspended animation to revive in the 20th century, desiring to counsel and change his younger self. While Kang is successfully foiled, Rama-Tut is unable to prevent the accidental death of the Avenger the Swordsman. During an adventure in Limbo, it is revealed that Immortus is the future incarnation of both Kang and Rama-Tut.

While attempting to travel to the time of the Crusades, Hawkeye accidentally comes across Kang, sending both to the Old West. The warlord begins to develop a stronghold to conquer the 19th century, thus also conquering the present. Aided this time by Immortus, the Avengers, with some assistance from the Two-Gun Kid, confront Kang. While trying to muster the strength to defeat Thor, Kang overloads his armor and destroys himself, apparently erasing Immortus and Rama-Tut from existence.

Prime Kang and creation of alternate selves
Years later, the Beyonder plucks a living Kang from the timestream to participate on the villains' side in the first of the Secret Wars. Soon after, it is revealed that while Kang had indeed died, his constant time-traveling had created a number of alternate Kangs. The Kang to discover this had been drawn to Limbo after his time-travel vehicle was destroyed by Thor. Finding Immortus' remains inside his fortress, Kang assumes the "Lord of Time" to be deceased and discovers the alternate versions of himself using viewing devices he finds, although he does not realize that Immortus is also a version of himself. At one point, he brings Ravonna to Limbo from the moment before her death, unintentionally creating an alternate reality where he was slain. Determined to be the only Kang, he joins with two particularly cunning divergents whom he determines he cannot easily eliminate, the three forming a council that systematically destroys the other alternate versions. He destroys one of the other two Kangs, then brings in the Avengers as part of a plot to destroy the other one, although the latter Kang eventually discovers the plot. This Kang is delayed by Ravonna, who tells him that if he truly loves her he must not kill the first Kang, but he ignores her, goes after him anyway, and is destroyed. Immortus then reveals he faked his death and manipulated everything from behind the scenes. Now only the one "Prime" Kang remains, who Immortus tricks into absorbing the memories of all the slain Kangs, which drives him insane. Immortus then sends the Avengers back to their own timeline.

This Kang diverges into two alternate Kangs, and one is invited to join the Crosstime Kang Corps (or the "Council of Cross-Time Kangs"), which consists of a wide range of Kangs from multiple timelines who are searching for a Celestial "Ultimate Weapon". This Kang calls himself "Fred" (by his own admission a humorous nod to Fred Flintstone, with a prehistoric name being appropriate for a time-traveler) and has a brief encounter with the Avengers while trying to stop the space pirate Nebula from interfering with a timeline. The Prime Kang, having recovered, then attempts to manipulate the Avengers from a time vortex, and encounters the Fantastic Four in a bid to capture Mantis and use her to defeat a Celestial and the other Kangs, while "Fred" is incinerated by a Nebula-possessed Human Torch during a later battle with the Fantastic Four in the timestream.

New Empire, Avengers Forever, and Young Avengers
Later, the Prime Kang appears, captures the Vision, and battles both the Avengers and a new foe, Terminatrix, who is revealed to be a revived Ravonna. Kang is critically injured when he intercepts a blow from Thor's hammer Mjolnir that was meant for his old love, who is distraught over his sacrifice and teleports away with him. Terminatrix places Prime Kang in stasis to heal his injuries and assumes control of his empire. However, she finds the empire under attack by a chronal being called Alioth, and is forced to summon the Avengers to assist. She revives Kang, who assists the Avengers in defeating Alioth, but not before allowing the entity to kill the entire Crosstime Kang Corps.

In Avengers Forever, flashbacks reveal that many of Kang's recent actions were motivated by more of a desire to do something rather than a genuine desire for power, and that Rama-Tut is his past and future self, feeling listless and trapped by the burdens of the empire he has created. However, as Kang prepares to become Rama-Tut once again and from there Immortus, he glimpses the future and learns of Immortus's servitude to the Time-Keepers of the Time Variance Authority, renewing his horror at the destiny that awaits him as that 'simpering academic'. As a result, Kang rejects this future to the point of aiding the Avengers in protecting Rick Jones from Immortus's latest scheme. When Immortus betrays the Time Keepers to try and save the Avengers, they kill him and attempt to turn Kang into Immortus before Rama-Tut became Immortus. However, the temporal backlash of Kang's strength of will in a temporally unstable environment causes Immortus and Rama-Tut to split off from Kang, essentially making them  both clear alternate versions of Kang rather than Kang's definitive future. With the weakened Time Keepers destroyed, Kang rejoices in his freedom from the destiny of Immortus and Rama-Tut, as he has now technically become them while still being himself.

After some months, Kang embarks on an ambitious scheme to conquer the Earth, this time aided by his son Marcus, who uses the "Scarlet Centurion" alias. Kang promises any who aid him on Earth a place in his new order, which puts Earth's defenses and the Avengers under strain as they fight off villain after villain. He then takes control of Earth's defense systems, and forces a surrender after destroying Washington, D.C., killing millions. The Avengers continue to battle the forces of Kang's new empire, and Captain America eventually defeats him in personal combat. Although imprisoned, Kang is freed by his son, revealed to be only one of a series of clones, and kills clone Marcus for betraying him by assisting Warbird during the invasion and keeping it secret despite multiple opportunities to admit the truth; while Kang could tolerate the treachery if it allowed Marcus to become his own man, he cannot tolerate a traitor who remains active in his ranks. Depressed at his new loss, Kang retreats from Earth.

At some point, Kang travels back to his own past to prevent an incident where a confrontation with a bully left him in a coma for a year, but meeting his future self so horrifies Kang's past self that he steals Kang's armor and retreats to the past, using an emergency protocol created by the Vision to recruit a new team that come to be known as the 'Young Avengers', with the young Kang adopting the alias of 'Iron Lad'. When Kang tracks his younger self to the past, the Young Avengers are able to kill him, but the subsequent changes to history force the young Kang to return to his time and erase his memory of these events, although the Young Avengers remain as a team with Iron Lad's armor now self-operating with a consciousness based on an amalgamation of Iron Lad and the Vision.

Kang travels the multi-verse and recruits Stryfe, Earth-X Venom (May "Mayday" Parker), Doom 2099, Iron Man 2020, Ahab, Magistrate Braddock, and Abomination Deathlok to save the multi-verse and possibly restore the universes that have already been erased. He appears to the remaining members of the Avengers Unity Squad after Earth has been destroyed by a Celestial leaving only the mutants. Temporal barriers prevent Kang simply travelling back himself, but he is able to help the surviving Unity Squad members project their minds back into their past selves so that they can defeat the Celestial that attacked Earth. Kang subsequently attempts to steal the Celestials' power for himself, requiring Sunfire and Havok to put themselves at risk by absorbing some of his energy themselves so that they can force him to expend his stolen power.

Uncanny Inhumans and All-New, All-Different Marvel
Before the Inhuman king Black Bolt destroys the city of Attilan to release Terrigen Mist throughout the world, he sends his son Ahura away for Kang to foster. Black Bolt later releases a small amount of Terrigen Mist to activate Ahura's terrigenesis and activate his Inhuman ability. While Ahura is going through the change, Black Bolt asks Kang to save his son from the coming end of all things, which Kang agrees to on the condition that the son remain permanently in his care.

While taunting the Inhumans' efforts to find Ahura, another Kang emerges under the alias of "Mister Gryphon", claiming that he has become splintered into various alternate versions of himself as a result of recent temporal disruptions. With this Kang confined to the present, he mounts a massive assault on the Avengers with the aid of Equinox and a reprogrammed Vision, intending to use Mjolnir's time-traveling ability to return to his era, but is defeated.

When Vision abducts Kang's infant self in an attempt to defeat him, the latter, split into increasingly divergent versions of himself by the fractured state of time, retaliates by attacking various Avengers in their infant states. A possible future version of Kang saves key Avengers from his past self's attack by bringing them into Limbo until Hercules acquires an amulet from a former Fate that protects him from Kang's assault. During a battle inside a temple in Vietnam, the Wasp goes to place baby Kang back where he belongs. Kang is subsequently defeated.

During the "Infinity Countdown" storyline, Kang the Conqueror gains knowledge of the calamity that would come if the Infinity Gems were to be gathered in the same location again. To prevent this from occurring, he abducts Adam Warlock, convinces him to help secure the Soul Gem in exchange for the Time Gem, and sends him back in time to receive counsel from Kang's Rama-Tut counterpart.

Fresh start and Kang the Conqueror solo series
Kang the Conqueror has most recently been seen as a recurring character in the "Pottersville" arc of the Doctor Doom solo series, in which he is shown to be tethered to Doom in a quantum entanglement, appearing at random times throughout the series conversing with the Latverian despot. This is later revealed to be a ploy by Kang, as by aiding Doom in saving the world Kang is actually making the world easier for himself to conquer in two hundred years' time. In the solo series Kang the Conqueror, Kang rewrites history by manipulating a younger version of him to go through all of his previous identities – Iron Lad, Scarlet Centurion, Pharaoh Rama-Tut, and finally Kang – into becoming the purest form of would-be conqueror, resurrecting Ravonna by giving her the ability of reincarnation.

Powers and abilities
Kang has no superhuman abilities but is an extraordinary genius, an expert historical scholar, and a master physicist (specializing in time travel), engineer, and technician. He is armed with 40th-century technology, wearing highly advanced battle armor that enhances his strength, is capable of energy, hologram, and force-field projection, has a 30-day supply of air and food, and is capable of controlling other forms of technology. Courtesy of his "time-ship", Kang has access to technology from any century, and he once claimed his ship alone could destroy the Moon.

As Rama-Tut, he used an "ultra-diode" ray gun that was able to sap the wills of human beings. At a high frequency, it is able to weaken superhuman beings and prevent use of their superpowers. They can be freed from its effects if the gun is fired at them a second time.

Variations
There are different variations of Kang the Conqueror:

Pharaoh Rama-Tut
Pharaoh Rama-Tut was Kang's original alias when he ruled ancient Egypt. Later in life, he retires as Kang and returns to the Pharaoh Rama-Tut identity, and helps the Avengers defeat his past self when he attempts to capture the "Celestial Madonna". He nearly surrenders to destiny to become Immortus, but changes his mind and returns to the Kang identity when he discovers that Immortus is a pawn of beings called the Time-Keepers.

Immortus

Immortus is an alternate version of Kang who resides in Limbo. Kang was destined to become him until the last issue of the Avengers Forever series, in which powerful beings called the Time Keepers unintentionally separate the former from the latter.

Iron Lad

Iron Lad is an adolescent version of Kang who learned of his future self when Kang tried to prevent a childhood hospitalization. Attempting to escape his destiny, the teen Nate Richards steals his future self's advanced armor and travels back to the past, forming the Young Avengers to help him stop Kang. When his attempt to reject his destiny results in Kang's death, the resulting destruction caused by the changes in history forces Iron Lad to return to his time and undo the damage by becoming Kang.

Victor Timely

A divergent version of Kang establishes a small, quiet town called Timely, Wisconsin in 1901 to serve as a 20th-century base, where he occasionally resides as Mayor Victor Timely. Posing as his own son Victor Timely Jr., he develops an interest in a visiting college graduate named Phineas Horton, providing the young man with insights which eventually led to his creating the original Human Torch.

Scarlet Centurion
Numerous versions/relatives of Kang have assumed this alias, typically with a penchant for death games (setting teams of heroes against one another):
 Nathaniel Richards the Second, in a one-time identity he assumed after being the Pharaoh Rama-Tut but before going on to become Kang.
 Marcus Kang aka Marcus XXIII, the son of Kang the Conqueror who was active during Avengers Forever.
 A version of Kang who remained the Scarlet Centurion and conquered the alternate universe Earth-712.

Victorex Prime
Victorex Prime is a divergent version of the Scarlet Centurion who retained the identity and never became Kang, instead taking over the future of the Squadron Supreme's universe of Earth-712, in the 40th century. On becoming bored with his success and dictatorship over a total of fifteen moons and planets, Victorex Prime elects to invade the past for further conquests, coming into conflict with the Squadron Supreme by sending "temporal hard light holograms" of his Scarlet Centurion form to the past to fight on his behalf, and bringing a number of the team to his time in order to compete in death games, serving as the champions of the Earth-616 Grandmaster against Victorex Prime's own Institute of Evil. On losing, Victorex Prime inadvertently inspires the Grandmaster to issue similar challenges to other divergent versions of Kang.

While arranging for his fourth invasion into the past, sending a holographic envoy of his Scarlet Centurion form ahead of him as herald, Victorex Prime is left shaken when Hyperion, "not in the mood" for battle, while mourning a loss, informs him that while he has been allowed to live on his previous defeats, he will be executed if he attempts to invade the past when any members of the team are mourning as per the historical record, and that he would slowly kill Victorex Prime personally should he break these rules. Daunted, Victorex Prime flees to the future, resorting to subtle ways to mess with the Squadron by interfering with Tom Thumb's attempts to develop a cure for cancer (and all other diseases, as well as ageing), before succumbing to depression, having conquered everything in the past, present, and future, after a temporal bubble emerges around the late 20th century and surrounding decades, preventing him from visiting the time.

Thirty-five years later, still unchallenged and unfulfilled, Victorex Prime's followers discover a crack in the temporal bubble, displaying a massive humanoid hand emerging from space and growing large enough to engulf the Earth, the Sun, and all of space itself. Emboldened by this new challenge, and once again able to access the past, Victorex Prime sends a new temporal hologram backwards in time to confer with the Master Menace, the greatest criminal scientist of his age, simultaneously with Hyperion seeking out the scientist. Reached a reluctant truce, the Master Menace conceives of a device for Hyperion to use stop the entity's spread over the next ten hours, while Victorex Prime transports Master Menace to his future, where he spends fifteen years perfecting his work before returning the completed device to Hyperion less than an hour after leaving. Holographically accompanying Master Menace and the Squadron Supreme as they journey into space to confront the entity, Victorex Prime realises he enjoys the excitement of being a superhero instead of a supervillain, and holographically accompanies Master Menace and the Squadron Supreme as they journeyed out into space to confront the entity.

However, on calculating the present is diverging from his own future, and seeking to preserve his former foes on the failure of Master Menace's device, Victorex Prime retrieves the all-powerful telepath known as the Overmind, believing his power could turn back the entity. After Overmind instead has his head exploded, a terrified Victorex Prime dejectedly admits defeat, and prepares to flee to his future. At the last moment, Arcanna Jones begs Victorex Prime to save the life of her infant son, Benjamin Thomas Jones, which after a moment of consideration, Victorex Prime refuses. With the crack in the temporal bubble sealing shut after returning to the 40th century. Immediately regretting his decision, and unaware of the Squadron's fates, Victorex Prime spends the remaining 211 years of his life in abject misery, unaware that the Squadron survived, because of his decision to leave Benjammin behind (who swapped fates with the entity and reversed its annihilation across multiple universes), and deeming the day he left the Squadron behind to die as "the key moment" that he "lost his nerve", living on in the shame of retreat rather than facing the unknown alongside the worthiest of former foes, and eventually dying of old age, unfulfilled, without the knowledge he coveted most in the world.

Chronomonitor #616
Chronomonitor #616 is a variation of Kang the Conqueror who works for the Time Variance Authority (TVA), inducted into the organization on his first attempt to travel back in time. A renegade Chronomonitor from the organization, he is stripped of his power after interfering with history for personal gain as part of a mid-life crisis before escaping custody and killing and replacing a version of himself as Rama-Tut. Ultimately, Chronomonitor #616 is trapped in a time loop by the TVA, swearing revenge upon them and the Fantastic Four.

Mister Gryphon
Qeng Gryphon, or simply Mister Gryphon, is a variation of Kang the Conqueror that is confined to the present. He is an Asian American businessman and the CEO of Qeng Enterprises.

Crosstime Kang Corps
Numerous versions/successor of Kang form the members of this organization, also known as the Council of Cross-Time Kangs:

 Frederick "Fred" Kang, who named himself after the cartoon character Fred Flintstone. He is later incinerated by a Nebula-possessed Human Torch.
 Kang Nebula, a variant of the space pirate of the same name, who succeeded Kang's kingdom in her timeline.
 Kang Kong, a version of Kang from a dimension occupied by super-intelligent apes (later retroactively established as the Marvel Apes universe), named in reference to King Kong.

Reception

Accolades
 In 2009, IGN ranked Kang the Conqueror 65th in their "Top 100 Comic Book Vilains" list.
 in 2019, CBR.com ranked Kang the Conqueror 4th in their "10 Fantastic Four Villains We Want To See In The MCU" list.
 In 2019, IGN ranked Kang the Conqueror 16th in their "Top 25 Marvel Villains" list.
 In 2021, Screen Rant included Kang the Conqueror in their "Marvel: The Avengers Main Comic Book Villains, Ranked From Most Laughable To Coolest" list and his Kangaroo the Conqueror persona in their "10 Best Spider-Ham Villains" list.
 In 2022, Collider ranked Kang the Conqueror 20th in their "20 Most Powerful Marvel Characters" list.
 In 2022, Newsarama ranked Kang the Conqueror 2nd in their "Best Avengers villains of all time" list.
 In 2022, Screen Rant included Kang the Conqueror in their "10 Most Powerful Avengers Villains In Marvel Comics" list and his Scarlet Centurion persona in their "15 Most Powerful Black Panther Villains" list.
 In 2022, CBR.com ranked Kang the Conqueror 2nd in their "Black Knight's 10 Strongest Villains" list, 3rd in their "10 Most Violent Marvel Villains" list, 7th in their "13 Most Important Marvel Villains" list,  8th in their "10 Greatest Iron Man Enemies" list, and 10th in their "Ms. Marvel's 10 Best Villains" list.

Other versions

Spider-Ham
The Spider-Ham reality contains a kangaroo named Kangaroo the Conqueror.

X-Men/Star Trek
In the X-Men/Star Trek crossover Second Contact, an alternate version of Kang disrupts a number of timelines before being defeated by the combined effort of the mutant X-Men and the crew of the Enterprise-E. His timehooks, which the two groups use to travel in time, later draw the X-Men into the Enterprise timeline when the Enterprise hook becomes exposed to verteron particles. This creates a link to the other hook, as Nightcrawler is similarly infused with verteron particles when he teleports.

Heroes Reborn
In the Heroes Reborn universe created by Franklin Richards, Kang and his lover Mantis travel to the modern era to battle the greatest heroes of all time, the recently formed Avengers. He wishes to utterly defeat them as a token of his love. Kang's assault on Avengers Island leads to the capture of all the Avengers, with Kang taking Thor's hammer, Captain America's shield, Swordsman's swords, Hawkeye's bow and arrows, and the Vision as his trophies. However, Thor frees himself and his fellow Avengers and easily bests Kang in a rematch, forcing the villain to flee the scene after ejecting the severely damaged Vision from his ship.
 
Kang and Mantis hide out in Peru, where they plot their revenge against the Avengers. This plot would never come to fruition, as Loki absorbs the two in his bid to take over the Earth. Loki is ultimately defeated, and while many of the super-beings that he absorbed are seen active following the battle, this Kang's and Mantis' ultimate fates are not depicted.

Ultimate Marvel
A female version of Kang appears in the Ultimate universe, claiming she has a plan to prevent the destruction of Earth. It is revealed she is from an alternate Earth sent back with a containment suit, arriving one week after the Ultimatum Wave destroyed New York, convincing Reed Richards/Maker to stop it from happening to his own. Kang eventually reveals that she is Sue Storm.

Spider-Geddon
An alternate universe version of Kang called Kang the Conglomerator appears in Edge of Spider-Geddon #1. This version is a businessman from the year 2099 who wants to take Spider-Punk back to his time to take control of his franchise because of his marketability. Opposing this idea, Spider-Punk fights and defeats Kang with help from Captain Anarchy and the Hulk. As he disappears, Kang reveals Spider-Punk will die young while Captain Anarchy will die an old man.

Collected editions

In other media

Television
 Rama-Tut appears in a self-titled episode of Fantastic Four, voiced by Mike Road.
 Kang the Conqueror appears in The Avengers: United They Stand episode "Kang", voiced by Ken Kramer. This version hails from the 41st century, where he was overthrown during a revolution and imprisoned between dimensions, with an obelisk as his only means of escape.
 Rama-Tut makes a non-speaking cameo appearance in X-Men: Evolution.
 Kang the Conqueror appears in The Avengers: Earth's Mightiest Heroes, voiced by Jonathan Adams. This version hails from the 41st century. Introduced in the episode "Meet Captain America", Kang's timeline is retroactively erased from existence due to a temporal anomaly, which leaves his lover Princess Ravonna in a coma. Kang traces the disturbance to Captain America's presence in the 21st century, and in the episode "The Man Who Stole Tomorrow", launches an attack against the Avengers, taking them to his time to show them the devastation he claims Captain America caused. However, Iron Man gains access to Kang's Time Chair and transports everyone back. Injured and defeated, Kang escapes to his flagship, the Damocles, and prepares to conquer Earth with his armada. In the episode "The Kang Dynasty", the Avengers launch an attack against him, boarding the ship and sending most of the armada back to the 41st century. Before they can return Kang's ship, the Wasp discovers what happened to Ravonna and convinces her team to find a way to save her. In the episode "New Avengers", the Council of Kangs frees the original Kang from prison and provides him with new armor, which he uses to take over Stark Tower so he can use its arc reactor to bring his citadel to the 21st century, incidentally causing "time ripples" across New York and scattering the Avengers across time. In response, the New Avengers Protocol is activated and Spider-Man, War Machine, Wolverine, the Thing, Luke Cage, and Iron Fist join forces to defeat Kang, casting him out of the timestream and returning the original Avengers to the present while S.W.O.R.D. repurposes the Damocles as their headquarters.
 Kang appears in Avengers Assemble, voiced by Steve Blum. This version hails from the 30th century. Throughout the series, he battles the Avengers amidst failed attempts to destroy Manhattan and negate his rival Iron Man 2020's existence, with one appearance seeing him join the Cabal in successfully scattering the Avengers across time and space, though they are eventually reunited.
 Kang appears in Marvel Future Avengers, voiced by Jiro Saito in the Japanese version and reprised by Steve Blum in the English dub. This version is the leader of the Masters of Evil and the mastermind behind the Emerald Rain Project, an attempt to reverse-engineer Terrigen Crystals to create a race of superhumans under his control and defeat the Inhumans in his time.

Marvel Cinematic Universe
Jonathan Majors portrays Kang the Conqueror and his alternative variants in media set in the Marvel Cinematic Universe:

 "He Who Remains", a composite character based on his namesake as well as Immortus, appears in the finale of the first season of Loki, where it is revealed he is a variant of Kang. Loki and Sylvie arrive at the Citadel at the End of Time, where they meet He Who Remains, who claims he was a scientist from Earth in the 31st century who explored the multiverse until other variants of himself caused a multiversal war. He Who Remains found and harnessed Alioth to end the war and created Time Variance Authority (TVA) to maintain the Sacred Timeline. He Who Remains offers Loki and Sylvie the choice of either killing him and risk another war or take his place. Sylvie betrays Loki and kills He Who Remains.
 Several variants of the character, such as Kang the Conqueror, debuted in Ant-Man and the Wasp: Quantumania. This version of Kang was a multiversal traveler who believed that the multiverse was dying due to his variants and instigated a war to stop them, but was eventually captured by the Council of Kangs and exiled to the Quantum Realm. There, he met Janet van Dyne and worked with her to fix his ship's energy core and take them both home. After years of failed attempts, they successfully re-powered it, but she learned of his true nature and used her Pym Particles to prevent him from accessing the core by enlarging it to a giant size in the heart of a complex anomaly, keeping them both trapped. Despite this, Kang conquered the Quantum Realm, built a new empire, and recruited Darren Cross into his ranks. In 2025, after Janet, Hank Pym, their daughter Hope van Dyne, Scott Lang, and his daughter Cassie are transported to the Quantum Realm and separated, Kang captures the Langs and makes a deal with Scott to help him retrieve the core. Scott is successful, but Kang betrays him. After Cassie instigates a rebellion against him, Kang engages Scott in battle until Hope helps the latter knock Kang into the core. In the mid-credits scene, the Council of Kangs, led by Immortus, Rama-Tut, and Centurion, discuss their fallen variant and plan a multiversal uprising against the Avengers of Scott's universe. In the post-credits scene, Victor Timely operates on Earth in the 1900s.
 Majors will reprise his role as Timely in the second season of Loki.
 Majors will reprise his role as Kang in Avengers: The Kang Dynasty, and Avengers: Secret Wars.

Video games
 Kang appears as a boss and unlockable playable character in Marvel Avengers Alliance (2012).
 Kang appears as a boss in Marvel Contest of Champions (2014).
 Kang appears as a boss and playable character in Lego Marvel Super Heroes 2 (2017), voiced by Peter Serafinowicz. He captures specific locations in time and space to form Chronopolis and later tricks the Avengers into defeating Man-Thing so he can destroy the Nexus of All Realities. During the final battle, Captain America defeats Kang before Ravonna uses his time crystal to regress him to an infant. In the post-credits, an elderly Kang joins Ravonna, Cosmo the Spacedog, Man-Thing, and the Supreme Intelligence in warning Captain America, Captain Marvel, and Iron Man of a new threat.

Miscellaneous
 Kang the Conqueror appears in The Avengers: Earth's Mightiest Heroes tie-in comic book.
 The band Ookla the Mok devoted a song to Kang on their 2013 album vs. Evil.
 The Council of Kangs, renamed the Timelines of Kang, appear in Legendary: A Marvel Deck Building Games "Annihilation" expansion, consisting of Kang the Conqueror, Iron Lad, Pharaoh Rama-Tut, and the Scarlet Centurion.

References

External links
 Kang the Conqueror and Rama-Tut at Marvel.com
 A Brief History of Kang

Characters created by Jack Kirby
Characters created by Stan Lee
Comics characters introduced in 1963
Comics characters introduced in 1964
Fictional characters from parallel universes
Fictional dictators
Fictional filicides
Fictional mass murderers
Fictional pharaohs
Marvel Comics male supervillains
Marvel Comics scientists
Marvel Comics supervillains
Time travelers
Video game bosses
Villains in animated television series